The Malaita boobook (Ninox malaitae) is a small to medium-sized owl.  It is endemic to Malaita. It was formerly considered a subspecies of the Solomons boobook.

References

Malaita owl
Endemic birds of the Solomon Islands
Owls of Oceania
Least concern biota of Oceania
Malaita owl
Taxa named by Ernst Mayr